Robert Gregory may refer to:

Politicians
Robert Gregory (MP for Weymouth and Melcombe Regis) (fl. 1588), MP for Weymouth and Melcombe Regis (UK Parliament constituency)
Robert Gregory (MP) (1729–1810), English politician
Robert John Gregory, Member South Australian House of Assembly, electorate of Florey, 1982–1993
Robert Gregory (Indiana judge) (1811–1885), American lawyer and politician in the Indiana Senate and on the Indiana Supreme Court

Others
Robert Gregory (priest) (1819–1911), former Dean of St Paul's
Robert Gregory (RFC officer) (1881–1918), Irish cricketer and artist

See also
Bob Gregory (disambiguation)
Roberta Gregory (born 1953), American comic book writer and artist